Arthur Lewis (1830 – 1 June 1907) was an Australian cricketer. He played one first-class cricket match for Victoria in 1856.

See also
 List of Victoria first-class cricketers

References

1830 births
1907 deaths
Australian cricketers
Victoria cricketers
Place of birth missing